Khalil Abi-Nader (born December 6, 1921, in Mtein, Lebanon – died on June 14, 2009) was an Archeparch of the Maronite Catholic Archeparchy of Beirut.

Biography

Life

Khalil Abi Nader came from the well-known Lebanese family Abi Nader and was born in the Mount Lebanon Governorate in Matn District on December 6, 1921.

Ordained to the priesthood in the Archeparchy of Beirut on June 29, 1947, he was a teacher at the school La Sagesse in Beirut, later its director in Beirut and Jdeidé.

On April 4, 1986, Abi-Nader was elected archbishop of the Archeparchy. His solemn consecration took place on 18 May 1986 by the hands of the Maronite Patriarch of Antioch Nasrallah Boutros Sfeir. His co-consecrators were the bishops Chucrallah Harb, Eparch of Joubbé, Sarba and Jounieh and Roland Aboujaoudé, Auxiliary Bishop of Antioch. Archeparch Abi-Nader acted as co-consecrator in the episcopal ordinations of Abdallah Bared, Antoine Torbey, Paul-Emile Saadé and Béchara Raï.

Abi-Nader retired of his office on June 8, 1996 and died on June 14, 2009.

Political influence in the Lebanese society

Abi-Nader was repeatedly abducted, but was released on intervention of various politicians repeatedly. Together with the Imam Musa al-Sadr, he was committed to an understanding of both religions in Lebanon. During the military clashes between the Lebanese Forces (LF) and the regular Lebanese army, he campaigned with his life for fire breaks. He was also one of the principal representatives of the Lebanese Society for preservation of Francophonie in Lebanon.

See also

Notes

External links
 http://www.lorientlejour.com/article/621722/Khalil_Abinader_n%27est_plus.html
 http://www.gcatholic.org/dioceses/diocese/beir3.htm

1921 births
2009 deaths
Lebanese Maronites
People from Matn District
20th-century Maronite Catholic bishops